Banzi is a town and comune in the province of Potenza,  Basilicata, southern Italy.

Called Bantia in antiquity, it was the site of the find of the bronze tablet known as the Tabula Bantina, which contains a fragment of the ancient Oscan language.

References

Sources
 

Cities and towns in Basilicata